Arnold Henry Jago (13 March 1913 – 17 September 1997), was a Liberal member of the New South Wales parliament representing the seat Gordon and a Minister of the Crown.

Early life
Jago was born in the Sydney suburb of Chatswood and educated at Newington College (1927–1928) before moving into a career of banking with the Bank of New South Wales in 1929.  He served in the Second Australian Imperial Force from 1939 to 1945 in the Middle East and New Guinea. He married Valerie Hunter in 1943 and had a daughter.  He served as an alderman on Ku-ring-gai Council from 1959 to 1965 and was the Mayor of Ku-ring-gai from 1960 to 1961.

Political career
In 1962, Jago was elected the member for Gordon in the New South Wales Legislative Assembly.  On the election of the Askin government he became Minister for Health and he held that position until he left parliament.  In the lead-up to the 1973 election Jago failed to lodge his nomination for the seat of Gordon before the closure of nominations. 
As a result, in order to prevent the Labor candidate from winning, most Liberal Party voters supported the Democratic Labor Party candidate Kevin Harrold, who therefore had an unexpected victory.

Jago died in the Sydney suburb of Killara in 1997.

References

1913 births
1997 deaths
Australian accountants
Australian Army officers
Australian Army personnel of World War II
Shire Presidents and Mayors of Ku-ring-gai
Members of the New South Wales Legislative Assembly
Liberal Party of Australia members of the Parliament of New South Wales
People educated at Newington College
20th-century Australian politicians